Nigeria Air is a proposed airline and flag carrier in Nigeria. The name and logo was unveiled at the Farnborough Air Show in the United Kingdom in July 2018.

History
Nigeria Air was announced at the Farnborough Air Show in 2018. Operations are expected to begin in December 2018. Ethiopian Airlines will have a stake in the company with 49% share. In 2017, the Nigerian government announced it will invest US$5 million in the venture. However, the Minister for State Aviation, Hadi Sirika, insists that the airline will be privately-operated. "It is a business, not a social service. The government will not be involved in running it or deciding who runs it. The investors will have full responsibility for this." According to a tweet by Tolu Ogunlesi, a Nigerian government communications official, the government will not own more than 5% of the airline.

Fleet
The Minister for State Aviation announced that the government is in negotiations with Airbus and Boeing to provide a fleet for the new national airline.

Destinations
Nigeria has bilateral air service agreements (BASAs) with 70 countries; however, only 30 are operating at the moment. Since Arik Air and Med-View Airline terminated their long-haul operations, only Air Peace has been operating long-haul flights. The airline is looking at 81 potential destinations. However, Group Captain John Ojikutu, an expert in Nigerian aviation, stated that operation to just 15 of the 30 countries with which Nigeria has functioning BASAs would be an adequate start.

Suspension 
Barely two months after its proposal, the Federal Government on 19 September 2018, announced the suspension of Nigeria Air, describing the move as a tough decision. The airline was set to take to the skies in a couple of months.

References

Airlines of Africa